Everything She Touched Turned Ampexian is a studio album by Prefuse 73. It was released on Warp Records on April 14, 2009.

Track listing

Charts

References

External links

2009 albums
Prefuse 73 albums
Warp (record label) albums